Madame Makes Her Exit is a 1932 German romantic comedy film directed by Wilhelm Thiele and starring Liane Haid, Hans Brausewetter, Hilde Hildebrand. It was shot at the Epinay Studios of Tobis Film in Paris. It premiered on 12 January 1932. A separate French-language version Amourous Adventure was also released, directed by Thiele with a largely different cast.

Cast
 Liane Haid as Madame Vernier
 Hans Brausewetter as Marcel Douzet
 Hilde Hildebrand as Eva, the friend
 Ilse Korseck as Georgette, the maid
 Elisabeth Pinajeff as the girlfriend of Verniers
 Paul Biensfeldt as Marcel's helper
 Ernst Dumcke as Herr Venier
 Karl Etlinger as Marcel's father
 Hugo Fischer-Köppe as Gaston
 Ernst Pröckl as Albert
 Toni Tetzlaff as Marcel's mother
 Albert Préjean

References

Bibliography

External links

1932 films
Films of the Weimar Republic
1932 romantic comedy films
German romantic comedy films
1930s German-language films
Films directed by Wilhelm Thiele
German multilingual films
German black-and-white films
Tobis Film films
Films with screenplays by Franz Schulz
Films with screenplays by Wilhelm Thiele
1932 multilingual films
1930s German films
Films shot at Epinay Studios